is a railway station on the Obama Line in the town of Wakasa, Mikatakaminaka District, Fukui Prefecture, Japan, operated by West Japan Railway Company (JR West).

Lines 

Station layout
The station consists of two opposed side platforms. The station has a Midori no Madoguchi staffed ticket office..

Adjacent stations

History
It was renamed Kaminaka Station on 10 April 1956. With the privatization of Japanese National Railways (JNR) on 1 April 1987, the station came under the control of JR West.

Passenger statistics
In fiscal 2016, the station was used by an average of 268 passengers daily (boarding passengers only).

Surrounding area

former Kaminaka town hall

See also
 List of railway stations in Japan

References

External links

  

Railway stations in Fukui Prefecture
Stations of West Japan Railway Company
Railway stations in Japan opened in 1918
Obama Line
Wakasa, Fukui